Konoagil Rural LLG is a local government area in New Ireland Province, Papua New Guinea. The LLG administers the southern peninsula of the island of New Ireland. The LLG is located in Namatanai District and its population is 10,503 (Census 2011). Languages in the area are Siar-Lak language, Kandas language, and Label language.

The LLG is bordered by the Namatanai Rural LLG in the west coast and the new Matalai Rural LLG in the east coast.

The current LLG president is Hon. James Pandi MPA.

The Konoagil LLG is one of the LLGs of Namatanai District of New Ireland situated at the Southern tip of the island of New Ireland Province.

The LLG has name the eastern part as the LAK and the western part as the KADAS, these are two different areas in the LLG, the eastern part then called East Coast Konoagil (LAK) and the western became known as the West Coast Konoagil (KADAS). It is one of the LLGs in the Province that contributes more economically into the Economy of the province through abundant resources such as agriculture, fishing, hunting, coco and copra, multiple logging companies are currently logging the trees.

Wards
01. Kamiang, Mimias, Lenai
02. Morkon (including the village of Lamoran)
03. Kamparam, Kamilal, Malum Ngis
04. Bakum, Silur Station
05. Pukunmal, Siar (including the village of Maliom)
06. Vudam Matkamlagir
07. Beriota, Malumpirau
08. Bakok, Maiatlik
09. Lambom
10. Lamassa
11. Kabaman
12. Kait (including the village of King)
13. Watpi
14. Tambakar
15. Siaman

References

  Siar at Ethnologue (18th ed., 2015)
  Hammarström, Harald; Forkel, Robert; Haspelmath, Martin; Bank, Sebastian, eds. (2016). "Siar-Lak". Glottolog 2.7. Jena: Max Planck Institute for the Science of Human History.
  Lean, G. A. (1991). Counting systems of Papua New Guinea: Volume 1: New Ireland Province (2nd ed., Vol. 1). Lae, Papua New Guinea: Department of Mathematics and Statistics Papua New Guinea University of Technology.
  Rowe, Karen. "SIAR-LAK GRAMMAR ESSENTIALS." SIAR-LAK GRAMMAR ESSENTIALS 50 (2005): n. pag. Summer Institute of Linguistics, 2005. Web. 12 Sept. 2016. Kandas language at Ethnologue (15th ed., 2005)
 Label at Ethnologue (18th ed., 2015)

Local-level governments of New Ireland Province